Tengrela may refer to:
 Tengréla, a town in Ivory Coast
 Tengréla Department, a department of Ivory Coast
 Lake Tengrela, a lake in Ouagadougou, Burkina Faso
 Tengrela, Burkina Faso, a town in Burkina Faso